Tempesta is an Italian surname. Notable people with the surname include:

Antonio Tempesta (1555–1630), Italian painter and engraver,
Cavalier Pietro Tempesta (Pieter Mulier II) (1637–1701), Dutch-Italian landscape painter
John Tempesta (born 1964), American drummer 
Mike Tempesta, rock guitarist
Bonnie Lynn Tempesta (1953–2014), baker
Orani João Tempesta (born 1950), Archbishop of Rio de Janeiro
Count Peter Tempesta (1291–1315), Count of Eboli

Italian-language surnames